Shahida Tareque Dipti is a Bangladesh Awami League politician and the former Member of Parliament from a reserved seat.

Career
Dipti was injured in the 2004 Dhaka grenade attack on Bangladesh Awami League rally led by Sheikh Hasina. She was elected to parliament from reserved seat as a Bangladesh Awami League candidate in 2009. She is the President of Dhaka North unit of Bangladesh Mahila Awami League.

References

Awami League politicians
Living people
Women members of the Jatiya Sangsad
9th Jatiya Sangsad members
21st-century Bangladeshi women politicians
21st-century Bangladeshi politicians
Year of birth missing (living people)